Events in the year 1875 in Portugal. There were 455,000 registered voters in the country.

Incumbents
King: Luís I 
President of the Council of Ministers: Fontes Pereira de Melo

Events
 Creation of the Lisbon Geographic Society.
 Creation of the Portuguese Socialist Party.
 First football match in the country.
 Publication of O Crime do Padre Amaro, by José Maria de Eça de Queirós.
 Rafael Bordalo Pinheiro creates the Zé Povinho character.

Births
 José Alberto dos Reis, jurist (died 1955)
 José António Duro, poet (died 1899)

Deaths
 22 May - Nuno José Severo de Mendoça Rolim de Moura Barreto, 1st Duke of Loulé, politician (born 1804)
 18 June - António Feliciano de Castilho, writer, poet (born 1800)
 Infante Sebastian of Portugal and Spain, infante (born 1811 in Brazil)

See also
List of colonial governors in 1875#Portugal

References

 
Portugal
Years of the 19th century in Portugal
Portugal